Grace Lore is a Canadian politician, who was elected to the Legislative Assembly of British Columbia in the 2020 British Columbia general election. She represents the electoral district of Victoria-Beacon Hill as a member of the British Columbia New Democratic Party. Since December 7, 2022, she is the Minister of State for Child Care.

Electoral Record

References

21st-century Canadian politicians
21st-century Canadian women politicians
British Columbia New Democratic Party MLAs
Women MLAs in British Columbia
Politicians from Victoria, British Columbia
Living people
Year of birth missing (living people)